The Ecuador women's national volleyball team represents Ecuador in international competitions in women's volleyball.  The dominant forces in women's volleyball on the South American continent are Brazil and Peru.

Results

South American Championships
 1977 — 8th place

Bolivarian Games
 2005 — 4th place

Roster
2005 (Bolivarian Games)
Head Coach:

References
CSV

Volleyball
National women's volleyball teams
Women's sport in Ecuador